Axel Waldemar Persson (1 June 1888 – 7 May 1951) was a Swedish archaeologist.

Biography
Persson  was born at Kvidinge in Skåne County, Sweden.
He studied at Lund University, as well as at the universities of Göttingen and Berlin.
He conducted a study trip to France, Italy, Greece and Asia Minor during 1920–21.

He excavated sites in the Argolid in Greece, including Asine, Dendra and Midea, as well as other sites in Asia Minor including Milas and Labraunda, searching for the origins of the Linear B writing system.
In the summer of 1926, he excavated an unpaved tholos tomb at Dendrá in Argolis 
The finds were added to the National Archaeological Museum, Athens.
In 1935, he excavated a prehistoric hill at  Gencik Tepe  in south-eastern Anatolia region of Turkey and   Hellenistic chamber tombs at Milas.
In 1937,  he returned to Dendrá where he excavated a chamber tomb. 

Persson  became an associate professor at Lund University in 1915 and a professor  at Uppsala University from 1924.
He was professor of classical archaeology and ancient history at Uppsala University until his retirement in 1951.
He was of great importance as an inspiring teacher. His graduates,  including   Åke Åkerström and Einar Gjerstad, made significant contributions to the field of archaeology.

Personal life
He was married during 1913 to Victoria Mirea (1887-1958), He died during 1951 and was buried at  Uppsala gamla kyrkogård.

References

Other sources
.
.
.
.
.
.
. Retrieved 2009-08-13.
. Retrieved 2009-08-13.

1888 births
1951 deaths
People from Åstorp Municipality
Swedish archaeologists
20th-century archaeologists
 Lund University alumni
Academic staff of Lund University
Academic staff of Uppsala University
Burials at Uppsala old cemetery